A tautonym is a scientific name of a species in which both parts of the name have the same spelling, such as Rattus rattus. The first part of the name is the name of the genus and the  second part is referred to as the specific epithet in the International Code of Nomenclature for algae, fungi, and plants and the specific name in the International Code of Zoological Nomenclature.

Tautonymy (i.e., the usage of tautonymous names) is permissible in zoological nomenclature (see List of tautonyms for examples). In past editions of the zoological Code, the term tautonym was used, but it has now been replaced by the more inclusive "tautonymous names"; these include trinomial names such as Gorilla gorilla gorilla and Bison bison bison.

For animals, a tautonym implicitly (though not always) indicates that the species is the type species of its genus. This can also be indicated by a species name with the specific epithet typus or typicus, although more commonly the type species is designated another way.

Botanical nomenclature

In the current rules for botanical nomenclature (which apply retroactively), tautonyms are explicitly prohibited. One example of a botanical tautonym is 'Larix larix'. The earliest name for the European larch is Pinus larix L. (1753) but Gustav Karl Wilhelm Hermann Karsten did not agree with the placement of the species in Pinus and decided to move it to Larix in 1880. His proposed name created a tautonym. Under rules first established in 1906, which are applied retroactively, Larix larix cannot exist as a formal name. In such a case either the next earliest validly published name must be found, in this case Larix decidua Mill. (1768), or (in its absence) a new epithet must be published.

However, it is allowed for both parts of the name of a species to mean the same (pleonasm), without being identical in spelling. For instance, Arctostaphylos uva-ursi means bearberry twice, in Greek and Latin respectively; Picea omorika uses the Latin and Serbian terms for a spruce.

Instances that repeat the genus name with a slight modification, such as Lycopersicon lycopersicum (Greek and Latinized Greek, a rejected name for the tomato) and Ziziphus zizyphus, have been contentious, but are in accord with the Code of Nomenclature.

See also 
List of tautonyms
Binomial nomenclature
Reduplication
List of tautological place names

References

External links 

International Code of Zoological Nomenclature, Chapter 4, Art. 18 and Chapter 6, Art. 23.3.7

Biological nomenclature
Reduplication
Taxonomy (biology)